Clearwater is a river of southern Alberta, Canada. Situated entirely in the Canadian Rockies and the Rocky Mountain foothills of Alberta, it is a glacier fed upper reach tributary of the North Saskatchewan River.  The upper reach of the Clearwater has become popular for equestrian travelers due to the natural setting along the river.

Course

 The river begins in Banff National Park on the southern slope of Mount Willingdon immediately into the Devon Lakes at Clearwater Pass.
 From the Devon Lakes it flows  and descends  to Clearwater Lake.
 About  after Clearwater Lake and  down the river hits Trident Lake, where it becomes navigable by canoe, although it is not recommended for paddling until it reaches Timber Creek ( downstream) because of dangerous and variable river wide log jams. 
There are two class III rapids, and a dangerous blind corner that feeds "Heart Attack Log Jam" (a nearly river wide log jam that requires very good class III paddling skills and tight maneuvering to successfully navigate) before reaching Banff Park boundary.
 The river travels east  more and descends  before turning north and exiting the Ram Range in the Rocky Mountain Foothills. There is one class III rapid a little outside the park boundary, many tight log gardens, and braided channels that end in complete obstruction by logs, as well as one section just downstream of the wagon crossing where the river dives through mature forest and logs with no navigable channel, requiring a 50 meter portage through dense bush and logs.
 About  further along, the river turns east again and meets its first road around Idlewild Mountain.
 About  later, the river turns northwest.
 About  further, the river empties into the North Saskatchewan River.

Tributaries

 Martin Creek
 Roaring Creek
 Malloch Creek
 Peters Creek
 Forbidden Creek
 Timber Creek
 Washout Creek
 Peppers Creek
 Elk Creek

 Idlewild Creek
 Cuttoff Creek
 Rock Creek
 Limestone Creek
 Seven Mile Creek
 Pineneedle Creek
 Tay River
 Alford Creek
 Prairie Creek

Photo gallery

See also
 List of rivers of Alberta

References

Wild Rivers. Alberta., by Canada. Wild Rivers Survey.

External links

Clearwater River Expedition - A journal log with photos describing a hike along the Clearwater River.

Rivers of Alberta
North Saskatchewan River